Rensselaer at Work is the online division of Rensselaer Polytechnic Institute, operating administratively from facilities in Hartford, Connecticut, since 1955. Until 1997, it was known as the Hartford Graduate Center. The primary focus of the division is to offer graduate-level professional education to learners across the country via its digital delivery.

History
The Hartford Graduate Center was established in 1955 by Rensselaer and the United Aircraft Corp (a predecessor to Raytheon Technologies) to address a shortage of scientists and engineers in southern New England. United Aircraft bought and equipped the first building and provided annual financing so that its employees could earn graduate degrees at no individual cost. These programs are also made open to professionals employed at other area organizations.

The Graduate Center began with 220 students and seven faculty members who relocated from Rensselaer's main campus in Troy, NY to Connecticut, along with adjunct professors from local industry. An additional campus was founded in Groton, Connecticut, to respond to the educational demands of Electric Boat, a subsidiary of General Dynamics. By the late 1990s, with students from more than 100 corporations, attendance grew to nearly 2,000 students.

In December 1996, trustees of both Rensselaer and the Hartford Graduate Center voted to transfer Hartford's assets and have it more directly controlled by RPI. Under the new arrangement, Hartford had its own board of trustees, named by the Rensselaer president.

In 1997, the Hartford Graduate Center was renamed Rensselaer at Hartford, and after a new digital transformation, it has become Rensselaer at Work.

Campus

The Hartford center has a  landscaped campus readily accessible from both Interstates 84 and 91. The center of the campus contains the main building, the "Tower Building" which contains about 30 classrooms, each seating 10–50 persons. Adjacent to the Tower Building is "Seminar Hall", with additional classrooms and a small auditorium, which can be rented for conferences and special events. Since moving to an entirely digital format of instruction for working professionals, the Institute has closed the Groton facility, and operates administratively from the Hartford campus.

Academics
Rensselaer at Work offers professional master's degree programs in Mechanical Engineering, Systems Engineering and Technology Management, and Engineering Science. Credit-bearing graduate certificates in Managing Technical Organizations, Leading Change and Innovation, Business Intelligence, Production Analytics, Machine Learning & AI, Supply Chain and Logistics, Systems Engineering, and Lean Quality in Production can be taken on their own, or applied towards the completion of a master's degree program. Curricula for these programs were developed through feedback from industry, centered around a project-based approach, with students receiving individualized mentorship through their work with RPI Faculty Practitioners – faculty bearing industry experience and expertise.

Customized, and cohort programs are also offered in the areas of Leadership and Executive Development.

Notable alumni
Erroll M. Brown, USCG rear admiral, 13th District Commander (Ret.)
Thomas J. Haas, American academic
Jon Hall (programmer), board chair, Linux Professional Institute
Richard Mastracchio, engineer and NASA astronaut
Steven H. Ratti, USCG rear admiral, Joint Interagency Task Force West Commander (Ret.)
Jack Swigert, engineer, politician, Apollo 13 Astronaut
John S. Thackrah, Assistant Secretary of the Navy (former)
Dennis Tito, engineer, entrepreneur, world's first space tourist

See also

Houman Younessi, assistant dean of academic programs, director of RISE

References

External links
 Official website

Rensselaer Polytechnic Institute
Private universities and colleges in Connecticut
Technological universities in the United States
Education in Hartford, Connecticut
Educational institutions established in 1955
Buildings and structures in Hartford, Connecticut
Universities and colleges in Hartford County, Connecticut
1955 establishments in Connecticut